Johan Alfred Svendsen (born 4 September 1886) was a Norwegian politician.

He was born in Arendal to Gabriel Svendsen and Karen Sofie Røstad. He was elected representative to the Storting for the period 1931–1933 and 1934–1936, for the Conservative Party. He served as mayor of Lillehammer from 1922 to 1928.

References

1886 births
Year of death missing
People from Arendal
Conservative Party (Norway) politicians
Members of the Storting
Mayors of places in Oppland